Vladislav Kulikov (born 8 July 1996) is a Russian professional racing cyclist, who most recently rode for UCI ProTeam . He rode in the men's team pursuit event at the 2017 UCI Track Cycling World Championships.

Major results

Track
2017
 National Championships
2nd Scratch
3rd Individual pursuit
3rd Team pursuit
3rd Madison
 3rd Team pursuit, 2016–17 UCI Track Cycling World Cup, Cali

Road
2018
 2nd Under-23 National Time Trial Championships
 6th Overall Five Rings of Moscow
2022
 4th Grand Prix Mediterranean

References

External links
 

1996 births
Living people
Russian male cyclists
Place of birth missing (living people)